The Bargo River, a watercourse of the Hawkesbury-Nepean catchment, is located in the Southern Highlands and Macarthur districts of New South Wales, Australia.

Course
The Bargo River rises in the southern slopes of Southern Highlands, north of Colo Vale, and flows generally north-east, joined by two minor tributaries, before reaching its confluence with the Nepean River, near Bargo.

In its upper catchment, the river runs through Bargo River State Conservation Area, a nature reserve located between Hill Top and Yerrinbool.

See also

 List of rivers of Australia
 List of rivers of New South Wales (A–K)
 Rivers of New South Wales

References

Southern Highlands (New South Wales)
Macarthur (New South Wales)
Bargo, New South Wales